Khiam (sometimes spelled Khiyam) is a large town in the Nabatieh Governorate of Southern Lebanon.

Location

Origin of name
E. H. Palmer wrote that the name means "The tents".

History

Ottoman period
In 1596, it was named as a village, Hiyam, in the Ottoman nahiya (subdistrict) of  Tibnin  under the liwa' (district) of Safad, with a population of 111 households and 7 bachelors, all Muslim. The villagers paid a  tax on  agricultural products, such as wheat, barley, olive trees, vineyards,  goats and beehives, in addition to "occasional revenues"; a total of 6,914 akçe.

In 1838, Eli Smith noted  it as el-Khiyam; a Metawileh, "Greek" Christian and Maronite village in Merj 'Ayun.

In 1875, Victor Guérin visited: "El Khiam contains two quarters: the one on the south, with a population of 700 Metawileh, and the other on the north, with 600 Christians, divided into Maronites, Greek-Orthodox, and Greek-Catholics, with some Protestants, who have founded a chapel and a school."

In 1881, the PEF's Survey of Western Palestine (SWP)  described it as: "A village, north-east of the Merj Ayun, built of stone, containing about 300 Christians and 200 Druzes. It contains a white round Moslem holy place and a modern church. It is situated on a low ridge, surrounded by figs, olives, and arable. The water supply is from three rock-cut cisterns, one birket, and the good spring of 'Ain ed Derdarah."

After independence
During the 1990s, Khiam became known for the Khiam Detention Center, operated by the South Lebanon Army during the Israeli occupation of Southern Lebanon. Lebanese Muslim civilians  were  exposed to torture in this camp and faced indefinite detention once arrested. The prison was captured by Hezbollah during the Battle of Khiam in 2000, shortly before Israeli withdrawal from the South Lebanon security belt.

The town saw a major confrontation between the Israeli Army and Hezbollah fighters in the 2006 Lebanon War, during which a United Nations post was bombed by the Israeli Army killing four United Nations Military Observers.

Notable people 

 Ali Daher (born 1996), Lebanese footballer

References

Bibliography

External links
Survey of Western Palestine, Map 2:   IAA, Wikimedia commons
 Khiyam, Localiban
 Khiam Official website
 Khiam center
 In focus: Al-Khiyam, BBC profile

Populated places in the Israeli security zone 1985–2000
Populated places in Marjeyoun District